Hacıhalil is a Turkish name that may refer to the following places in Turkey:

 Hacıhalil, Adıyaman, a village in the district of Adıyaman, Adıyaman Province
 Hacıhalil, Besni, a village in the district of Besni, Adıyaman Province
 Hacıhalil, Horasan
 Hacıhalil, İskilip
 Hacıhalilarpaç, a village in the district of Erdemli, Mersin Province